X Factor was a Turkish reality television talent show presented by Gamze Özçelik and produced by Med Yapım and Alketa Vejsiu. During the live shows, the show was cancelled and pulled off the air on 19 July 2014 due to poor ratings.

Contestants

Results Summary

External links

Turkey
2014 Turkish television series debuts
2014 Turkish television series endings
Turkish television series
Television series by Med Yapım
Turkish-language television shows
Kanal D original programming
Turkish television series based on British television series